is a former Japanese football player.

Playing career
Matsuda was born in Higashiosaka on August 23, 1973. After graduating from high school, he joined his local club Gamba Osaka in 1993. Although he played as midfielder, he could not play many matches. In 1996, he moved to Regional Leagues club Albireo Niigata (later Albirex Niigata). In 1998, he moved to Regional Leagues club Sagawa Express Osaka. He retired at the end of 1998 season.

Club statistics

References

External links

1973 births
Living people
Association football people from Osaka Prefecture
Japanese footballers
J1 League players
Gamba Osaka players
Albirex Niigata players
Association football midfielders
Naturalized citizens of Japan
Japanese people of Korean descent